SMED can stand for:
Spondylo-meta-epiphyseal dysplasia, a type of skeletal disorder
Single-Minute Exchange of Die, one of the many lean production methods for reducing waste in a manufacturing process.